Kendall Gaskins (born November 4, 1990) is a former American football running back. He played college football at Richmond, and professionally for the Buffalo Bills, Tennessee Titans, New York Giants, and San Francisco 49ers. He was a running back coach for Grand Blanc High school in Michigan for the 2017-18 season, along with working as the student liaison at Perry Innovation Center in Grand Blanc, Michigan, but left in June of 2018 to pursue football again. He is now the leader of the character building group Game 7, where they go school to school building character to kids nationwide.

Professional career

Buffalo Bills
On April 29, 2013, Gaskins signed with the Buffalo Bills as an undrafted free agent. Buffalo released him on August 31, 2013, prior to the start of the regular season.

New York Giants
On December 31, 2013, he was signed to a Future/Reserve contract with New York Giants.

San Francisco 49ers
On September 1, 2014, he was signed to the 49ers 10-man practice squad. He was released on September 5, 2015 in order for the 49ers to make their 53-man roster. 
On November 1, 2015, he was put into the game against the St. Louis Rams. He had 5 carries for 6 yards and 2 receptions for 17 yards. On June 20, 2016, he was re-signed by the 49ers. On August 27, 2016, Gaskins was released by the 49ers.

References

External links
Richmond bio
Buffalo Bills bio

Living people
Buffalo Bills players
Richmond Spiders football players
1990 births
Tennessee Titans players
New York Giants players
San Francisco 49ers players
Woodberry Forest School alumni